Adrian Świderski (born 27 September 1986) is a Polish triple jumper.

He won the silver medal at the 2007 European U23 Championships, finished seventh at the 2011 Military World Games and won the bronze medal at the 2015 Military World Games. He also competed at the 2015 European Indoor Championships and the 2017 European Indoor Championships without reaching the final.

His personal best jump is 16.81 metres, achieved in May 2015 in Biala Podlaska.

International competitions

References 

1986 births
Living people
Polish male triple jumpers
Place of birth missing (living people)
Polish Athletics Championships winners